Plateros is a genus of net-winged beetles in the family Lycidae and the tribe Platerodini. Species are recorded from the Americas, Africa and Asia, including Sri Lanka, Indochina, Korea and Japan.

Species
BioLib includes:
 Plateros arizonensis Green, 1953
 Plateros australis Green, 1953
 Plateros avians Green, 1953
 Plateros batillifer Green, 1953
 Plateros bidens Green, 1953
 Plateros bispiculatus Green, 1953
 Plateros borealis Green, 1953
 Plateros capillaris Green, 1953
 Plateros capitatus Green, 1953
 Plateros carinulatus Green, 1953
 Plateros centralis Green, 1953
 Plateros coccinicollis Fall, 1910
 Plateros devians Green, 1953
 Plateros flavoscutellatus Blatchley, 1914
 Plateros floralis (Melsheimer, 1845)
 Plateros kalamensis Tvardik & Bocak, 2001
 Plateros knulli Green, 1953
 Plateros krivolutzkii L. Medvedev
 Plateros kurentzovi L. Medvedev
 Plateros lalui Tvardik & Bocak, 2001
 Plateros lictor (Newman, 1838)
 Plateros mamasensis Tvardik & Bocak, 2001
 Plateros milenae Tvardik & Bocak, 2001
 Plateros modestus (Say, 1835)
 Plateros nigerrimus Schaeffer, 1908
 Plateros nigrior Green, 1953
 Plateros ocularis Green, 1953
 Plateros orobuensis Tvardik & Bocak, 2001
 Plateros perditus Green, 1953
 Plateros peregrinus Green, 1953
 Plateros roseimargo Fall, 1910
 Plateros rubromamasensis Tvardik & Bocak, 2001
 Plateros sanguinicollis Horn, 1894
 Plateros sollicitus (LeConte, 1847)
 Plateros subfurcatus Green, 1953
 Plateros subtortus Green, 1953
 Plateros tanatorajensis Tvardik & Bocak, 2001
 Plateros timidus (LeConte, 1847)
 Plateros transpictus Green, 1953
 Plateros tumacacori Green, 1953
 Plateros ussuriensis Barovskij
 Plateros volatus Green, 1953

References

 Miller, Richard S. / Arnett, Ross H. Jr., Michael C. Thomas, Paul E. Skelley, and J. H. Frank, eds. (2002). "Family 59. Lycidae Laporte 1836". American Beetles, vol. 2: Polyphaga: Scarabaeoidea through Curculionoidea, 174–178.

Further reading

 Arnett, R.H. Jr., M. C. Thomas, P. E. Skelley and J. H. Frank. (eds.). (2002). American Beetles, Volume II: Polyphaga: Scarabaeoidea through Curculionoidea. CRC Press LLC, Boca Raton, FL.
 
 Richard E. White. (1983). Peterson Field Guides: Beetles. Houghton Mifflin Company.

External links

 NCBI Taxonomy Browser, Plateros

Lycidae